Jdeideh (also spelled al-Jdayde, al-Judaydah, Judaydat, Jdaideh, Jdeïdé, Jdaydeh, Jadida) may refer to the following places:

Israel
Jadeidi-Makr, a town in northern Israel.

Lebanon
Jdeideh el-Matn, a coastal municipality and capital of Matn District in the Mount Lebanon Governorate.
Jdeide, a little village located in the northern part of the Baalbek District
Jdeideh Marjayoun or Jdeidet Marjeyoun, a village located in the Marjeyoun District, in the Nabatieh Governorate of Southern Lebanon
Jdeideh, or Jdeideh, Keserouan:  a village in Keserouan District in Lebanon

Palestine
al-Judeida, a village in the Jenin Governorate

Syria
Al-Jdayde (Jdeideh Quarter), a historic neighbourhood in the city of Aleppo.
Jdeidat Artouz, a village in the Qatana District
Jdeidat al-Wadi, a village in the Qudsaya District
Jdeidat Yabous, a village in the Qudsaya District
al-Judaydah, Mhardeh, a village in the Mhardeh District
al-Judaydah, Salamiyah, a hamlet in the Salamiyah District
Judaydat al-Khas, a village in the Douma District